The twenty-third season of the American animated sitcom series South Park premiered on Comedy Central on September 25, 2019, and concluded on December 11, 2019 after 10 episodes aired. This season contained the 300th episode of the long-running TV show; the milestone was reached on October 9, 2019, when the third episode of the season premiered. Like previous seasons, this season also had dark weeks (weeks during which no new episode would air), after episodes four and seven. Trey Parker and Matt Stone continued to write, direct, and edit every episode the week prior to air, as the duo has done since the series' debut.

Similar to previous seasons, the season features continuing elements and a recurring storyline for the first six episodes while lampooning ICE detention centers, the 2019 film Joker,  media censorship in China, the anti-vaccine movement, plant based food, the Trump Administration, transgender people in sports, and the competition between traditional cable television and media streaming.

Production
On July 8, 2015, two months prior to the season 19 premiere, Comedy Central announced they had renewed South Park for an additional 30 episodes over three seasons. This renewal was in addition to the two-year contract already in place with Parker and Stone, guaranteeing South Park would air until at least 2019. On September 12, 2019, the show was renewed for seasons 24 through 26 until 2022.

Main theme

This season had multiple changes to the traditional theme song from the show. For the first six episodes of the season, an overall story arc focusing on Randy Marsh's marijuana farm named Tegridy Farms was featured. During these episodes, the theme song's lyrics and graphics were changed to focus on Tegridy Farms and also featured vocals by Randy Marsh and Towelie. In the episode "Board Girls", the regular theme was completely abandoned and replaced with a theme about the PC Babies, the politically correct children of PC Principal and Vice Principal Strong Woman. In the "Turd Burglars" episode, the theme returned to the show, but starring the women of South Park, in a fictional show titled "One for the Ladies". In the "Basic Cable" episode, the theme was abandoned again and replaced with a faux intro titled "The Scott Malkinson Show". The traditional theme song was put back in on the final episode "Christmas Snow".

Controversy
On October 7, 2019, South Park was reportedly banned from the Chinese Internet with videos, mentions, and discussion forums for the animated series being removed and shut down in response to episode 2 of the season, "Band in China". Later in the day South Park creators Trey Parker and Matt Stone mockingly apologized.

Episodes

Reception
On Rotten Tomatoes, the season holds a 50% approval rating based on 6 reviews.

Home media
The season was released in its entirety on DVD and Blu-ray on June 23, 2020.

References

2019 American television seasons